Survival of the Sickest is the fourth studio album by American rock band Saliva. It was released on August 17, 2004. "No Hard Feelings" is the only song which features rap vocals in the bridge and it also has the same exact lyrics in "No Regrets" just using a different musical approach to both songs. The album produced two singles: "Survival of the Sickest" in June 2004, and "Razor's Edge" in November 2004. The title track was featured in the video games NASCAR 2005: Chase for the Cup and Backyard Wrestling 2: There Goes the Neighborhood, and was the official theme song for WWE's Unforgiven 2004 pay per view.

Background and development
In an interview with MTV, lead singer Josey Scott explained how he and the band changed their approach to crafting the album by cooling down on the girls and partying so that they're "well rested and well prepared" to record material that Scott made on his free time: "On our last tour, I personally got in the back of the tour bus with a little Wal-Mart tape recorder and just started beating these songs out. So when we went into the studio this time, I was prepared. I had 25 songs ready to go."

Critical reception

Entertainment Weekly writer Sean Richardson found the album going back to the band's early hard rock sound from their 1997 self-titled debut, praising Josey Scott for crafting tracks that pay tribute to 80s hair metal and penning both "aching redemption songs and seething revenge tirades" that make it more contemporary. Johnny Loftus of AllMusic was mixed about the material throughout the record, criticizing the band's foray into "glowering, melodramatic plods ("No Regrets, Vol. 2", "Eyes Open")" and slumming with "massively compressed, hard-head rockers ("Carry On", "Fuck All Y'All")" but highlighted the title track, "Rock & Roll Revolution" and "Razor's Edge" for containing quality hard rock credentials with a Southern style, concluding with "That said, it's too bad the rest of Survival of the Sickest panders to unimaginative industry and genre posturing." Chuck Klosterman, writing for Spin, criticized Scott's musical craftsmanship on the album for giving the band a "crisis of confidence" when delivering his skewed vision of rock music, concluding that "Still, there's some Godsmackian guitar work on Survival of the Sickest, and the production has a Montana-esque vastness that will undoubtedly sound good on terrible radio stations across the U.S."

Track listing

Chart positions
Album

Singles

Credits
Credits adapted from album’s liner notes.

Saliva
Josey Scott - lead vocals, acoustic guitar, percussion
Wayne Swinny - lead guitar, backing vocals
Chris D'Abaldo - rhythm guitar, backing vocals
Dave Novotny - bass, backing vocals
Paul Crosby - drums

Additional personnel
Paul Ebersol – producer, strings, keyboards, drum programming
Matt Martone — engineer
Skidd Mills — mixing (tracks 1-3, 5-10, 12-14)
Andy Wallace — mixing (tracks 4, 11)
Howie Weinberg — mastering

References

External links

Saliva (band) albums
2004 albums
Island Records albums